Statistics of Swedish football Division 3 for the 2007 season.

League standings

Norra Norrland 2007

Mellersta Norrland 2007

Södra Norrland 2007

Norra Svealand 2007

Östra Svealand 2007

Västra Svealand 2007

Nordöstra Götaland 2007

Nordvästra Götaland 2007

Mellersta Götaland 2007

Sydöstra Götaland 2007

Sydvästra Götaland 2007

Södra Götaland 2007

Footnotes

References 

Swedish Football Division 3 seasons
5
Sweden
Sweden